Grim Dawn is an action role-playing game (ARPG), developed and published by Crate Entertainment for Microsoft Windows in February 2016 and released for Xbox One in December 2021. Developed using the Titan Quest engine, it is set in a thematically dark fictional world loosely based on the Victorian era. It has received generally favorable reviews from critics.

Plot
Grim Dawn takes place in Cairn, a setting in which humanity has been brought to near extinction by a trans-dimensional war.

The conflict begins when the humans in the setting begin to contact Aetherial entities from another dimension. Using what was learned from these entities, they open a portal to bring one into their own dimension and learn that the Aetherials could possess humans, and that these humans would retain enhanced abilities after the spirit was removed from the host. The people then released more Aetherials into the world, who themselves opened more portals and would intend to use humanity for their own purposes.

This attracted the attention of another race known as the Cthonians, who declared war to destroy humanity before it could be completely dominated. The war caused enormous numbers of casualties to the human population and damaged the fabric of reality, causing additional horrors to manifest.

The remaining human survivors reside in scattered enclaves, observing the war to learn of their enemies' weaknesses and using powers gained from exposure to the warp to prepare to retaliate at the invaders.

Gameplay

Grim Dawn is an action role-playing game that features fast-paced combat and emphasizes collecting loot, such as armor, potions, weapons, and money. The game's crafting system is similar to the one used in Warcraft III: Reign of Chaos's popular mod Defense of the Ancients. Grim Dawn also builds upon systems from Titan Quest, including improved physics, location-specific damage effects, dismemberment, the addition of factions, and a completely redesigned quest system.

Development
Crate Entertainment announced on July 27 2009, that they had licensed the Titan Quest engine from Iron Lore and announced Grim Dawn development on January 21, 2010. Initially, few details were revealed, with Crate Entertainment stating that Grim Dawn is set in a thematically dark fictional world loosely based on the Victorian era.

Grim Dawn's development is notable for Crate Entertainment's open appeal to their fans for financial support. In a posting on the game's official website, the developers announced that after a period of increased email activity from fans wishing to donate to Crate to support the project, they had added a pre-order page to the game's official website allowing fans to contribute to the project in an official manner. Fifteen days later in another posting on the game's official website, Crate stated that they had received financial support from the gaming website Gamebanshee and one of the authors of the gaming-related web comic Penny Arcade. Despite this support from their fans and various websites, Crate manager Arthur Bruno stated in an interview with The Escapist that pre-orders made for only a very small percentage of Grim Dawns total budget. In a later interview with the gaming website Big Download, Bruno again confirmed that donations and pre-orders alone were insufficient to fund the project completely. Additionally, Bruno revealed that Crate intended to provide new gameplay content for Grim Dawn through expansions every six to ten months.

On April 17, 2012, Crate Entertainment opened a project page on Kickstarter, setting a funding goal of $280,000, with the halfway point of this goal being reached in four days. It finished up with $537,515, well exceeding its initial funding goal. Crate released an alpha version of the game (Build 8) through the Steam Early Access program on May 15, 2013.

 Release 
On February 25, 2016, the game entered full release with v1.0.0.0 (build 31 hotfix 1). The version for Xbox One, featuring all previous DLC and expansions, was released on December 3, 2021.

Downloadable content and expansionsThe CrucibleOn August 3, 2016, a new game mode called The Crucible was released as downloadable content.Ashes of MalmouthOn October 11, 2017 Grim Dawns first expansion, Ashes of Malmouth, was released

The Forgotten Gods

On March 5, 2018, a second expansion was announced, called Forgotten Gods, and was released on March 27, 2019.

Reception

Critical reception

Grim Dawn received generally favorable reviews from 29 critics, according to review aggregator Metacritic.

Leif Johnson of PC Gamer wrote: "If anything, Grim Dawn is both empowered and chained down by its retro stylings, preventing, say, the randomized levels of Diablo III and thus its endless potential for replay. But on the upside, none of its recent competitors deliver that old-style hack-and-slash experience so purely and so satisfyingly, and its hybrid class system makes each new jaunt a little different. More than once it found me playing until dawn, and my appreciation for any game that manages to do that is anything but grim."

Sales
As of May 2017, Grim Dawn had sold over 1million units worldwide and its DLC, Crucible, over 200,000.

In a live stream on April 19, 2019, Crate announced that the Forgotten Gods expansion had sold over 100,000 copies, bringing the total number of copies sold between the base game and its DLC to over 3 million.

On May 31, 2020, one of the game's designers stated in a forum post that the game and its DLC were approaching a total of 5 million copies sold.

On 25 February 2022 Crate announced that the game and DLC's had sold 7 million copies.

References

External links

2016 video games
Action role-playing video games
Crowdfunded video games
Dark fantasy video games
Early access video games
Hack and slash role-playing games
Kickstarter-funded video games
Multiplayer and single-player video games
Role-playing video games
Video games developed in the United States
Video games featuring protagonists of selectable gender
Windows games
Xbox One games